"Come Baby Come" is a song by American rapper K7 featuring vocals by Camille, released as the first single from his debut album, Swing Batta Swing (1993). It peaked at number 18 on the US Billboard Hot 100 in December 1993 and number three on the UK Singles Chart in January 1994. The song was produced by Joey Gardner for Tommy Boy Records and received positive reviews from music critics. It was also certified gold by the Recording Industry Association of America (RIAA) on November 17, 1993. The accompanying music video was directed by Hype Williams.

Critical reception
In his review of the Swing Batta Swing album, Adam Greenberg from AllMusic noted that it "involve a good deal of those call and response patterns, but at a higher speed than most of the tracks, very danceworthy for a club". Larry Flick from Billboard wrote, "Do not even try to sit out this thick'n'chewy hip-hop throwdown ... it is next to impossible." He felt that the "infectious groove" is enhanced by "an anthemic, air-punching chorus that you will be chanting for days." He also added, "With his insanely infectious first solo single, former TKA member K7 is well on the way to a smokin' new career. The track is a rapid series of brain-embedding and bodyinvading hooks and refrains, laid over a butt-shagging hip-hop beat. Unbelievably catchy stuff." A reviewer from Music & Media stated, "The "vice versa rap" method-one guy talks and the rest counters collectively–is used in an ultra catchy way." 

John Kilgo from The Network Forty wrote that "reggae-inspired toasting dropped over a rhythmic hip-hop beat gospelish female vocals, paired with cadenced male chantings, defy simple categorization. Props to their self-interpretation of Paula Abdul's "Straight Up" done acapella". Mark Frith from Smash Hits viewed it as a "raw" and "exciting" track. Danyel Smith from Spin stated, "Hip hop mixed with dance mixed with a black-frat-style chorus, the song is as contagious as poison ivy." James Hunter from Vibe described it as a "serious goof", noting that it "unwinds like dancehall, jerks and cuts like hip hop, and shouts its seductions with the gutbucket abandon of Joe Tex's "I Gotcha". The phone rings just as K7 gets home to his sweetie ("Hello? Hello?)", hilariously interrupting the mood. But this record is really about his adventures after he slams the bedroom door."

Music video
A music video was produced to promote the single, directed by American music video director Hype Williams. It features the band riding around Jersey City, New Jersey in a 1955 Plymouth Belvedere convertible. Danyel Smith from Spin commented on the video, "K7's "Come Baby Come" single has been pushed to pop hit status with major assistance from its video. Built on slow, close-up shots of bouncing breasts and curvaceous ass cheeks, the clip is like 2 Live Crew on Valium."

Impact and legacy
In 2010, Pitchfork included "Come Baby Come" in their list of "Ten Actually Good 90s Jock Jams". In 2017, BuzzFeed ranked it number 61 in their list of "The 101 Greatest Dance Songs of the '90s".

Usage in media
"Come Baby Come" appears on the Little Fires Everywhere episode, "The Spider Web". The song is sampled in the song "BaDinga!" by TWRK which was a popular dance hit in 2015.

Track listing

 7" single, UK (1993)
A. "Come Baby Come" (Radio Edit)
B. "I'll Make You Feel Good" (Radio Edit)

 12", Europe (1993)
A1. "Come Baby Come" (Radio Edit) – 3:56
A2. "Come Baby Come" (Extended Version) – 5:13
B. "I'll Make You Feel Good" (Extended Version) – 4:54

 12" single, US (1993)
A1. "Come Baby Come" (Radio Edit) – 3:56
A2. "Come Baby Come" (Extended Version) – 5:13
A3. "Come Baby Come" (Instrumental) – 3:57
A4. "Come Baby Come" (Acapella) – 3:57
B1. "I'll Make You Feel Good" (Radio Edit) – 4:14
B2. "I'll Make You Feel Good" (Extended Version) – 4:54
B3. "I'll Make You Feel Good" (Acapella) – 4:51

 CD single, UK (1993)
"Come Baby Come" – 4:00
"Come Baby Come" (Dance Baby Dance) – 4:22
"I'll Make You Feel Good" (Extended Version) – 4:56
"Come Baby Come" (Skin Up Dub) – 6:34

 CD maxi-single, US (1993)
"Come Baby Come" (Radio Edit) – 3:56
"I'll Make You Feel Good" (Radio Edit) – 4:14
"Come Baby Come" (Extended Version) – 5:13
"I'll Make You Feel Good" (Extended Version) – 4:54
"Come Baby Come" (Instrumental) – 3:57
"Come Baby Come" (A Cappella) – 3:57
"I'll Make You Feel Good" (A Cappella) – 4:51

 Cassette single, UK (1993)
A1. "Come Baby Come" (Radio Edit)
A2. "I'll Make You Feel Good" (Radio Edit)
B1. "Come Baby Come" (Radio Edit)
B2. "I'll Make You Feel Good" (Radio Edit)

Charts and certifications

Weekly charts

Year-end charts

Certifications

Release history

References

1993 debut singles
1993 songs
Big Life Records singles
Hip hop songs
Music videos directed by Hype Williams
Tommy Boy Records singles